Norway sent a delegation to compete at the 2010 Winter Paralympics in Vancouver, British Columbia, Canada. A total of 27 Norwegian athletes competed in four disciplines; the only sport Norway did not compete in is alpine skiing.

Biathlon

Cross-country skiing

Women

Men

Ice sledge hockey

The Norwegian sledge hockey team qualified for the 2010 Paralympics by coming in second place at the 2009 IPC Ice Sledge Hockey World Championships.

Wheelchair curling

The Norwegian team qualified for the 2010 Paralympic wheelchair curling tournament based on their performance in the 2007, 2008, and 2009 World Wheelchair Curling Championships.

Norway's team continued the tradition from the Norwegian team at the Olympics, wearing pants from Loudmouth Golf.

See also
Norway at the 2010 Winter Olympics
Norway at the Paralympics

References

External links
Vancouver 2010 Paralympic Games official website
International Paralympic Committee official website

Nations at the 2010 Winter Paralympics
2010
2010 in Norwegian sport